Mitchell County High School is a secondary school located in Camilla, Georgia, United States. It is a part of the Mitchell County School District. The school educates students in grades 8–12.

Sports
 Basketball (boys' and girls')
 Baseball
 Cheerleading
 Football
 Tennis
 Track
 Volleyball
Wrestling

Academics
Mitchell County High offers a curriculum that includes college prep, AP, and SWGTC courses, which allow students to earn college credit while working towards their high school diplomas.

Vocational classes include agricultural classes, business education, family and consumer sciences, healthcare sciences, early childhood, culinary arts,etc.

MCHS has a Fine Arts department, which includes band.

School stadium
Mitchell County High School's Eagle's Stadium is also used by Mitchell County Middle School. The stadium is located at Mitchell County High School in Camilla,Ga.

The Mitchell County Eagles football team is led by Head Football Coach Dondrial Pinkins.

Home games for high school are played on Friday and Saturday nights; middle school and most junior varsity games are played on Thursdays.

Notable alumni
 Jumaine Jones, professional basketball forward for Bnei HaSharon of Israel
  Leroy Al Pinkins, former assistant basketball coach for the Ole Miss Rebels men's basketball team
 Grover Stewart, NFL defensive tackle for the Indianapolis Colts

References

External links
https://www.mitchell.k12.ga.us

Schools in Mitchell County, Georgia
Public high schools in Georgia (U.S. state)
Educational institutions established in 1980
1980 establishments in Georgia (U.S. state)